Chadra      is a  village  in Akkar Governorate, Lebanon.

The population is  Greek Orthodox and other  Christian.  
The village is situated at a distance of 146 km from Beirut at an altitude of 450 m above sea level. It has an area of 651 hectares, surrounded by Akroum from the east, the west Owainat, from the north Mashta hasan and Andaket from the south . Can be accessed in two ways, namely: Halba - Alkwychera - beere - Kobayat - Andguet and Chadra, and Halba - Alkwychera - Menjez - Remmeh - Chadra.

Chadra characterized by a mild climate in summer and winter and the presence of several archaeological sites, most notably the presence of remnants of seven old grinders, and was an old center to group the armies and was considered as center catering to them, as was a home of one of the conquests of Prince Fakhr al-Din.

The residents of this village are predominantly doctors of medicine, teachers, soldiers and officers in the Lebanese army (General Wehbe Katicha current parliament member and Colonel Jean El Atrach commander of the Lebanese Commando Regiment), police officers and engineers.

References

External links
Chadra,  Localiban

Populated places in Akkar District
Eastern Orthodox Christian communities in Lebanon